Daniel Joseph Tomasulo (born July 20, 1951) is an American counseling psychologist, writer, and professor and the Academic Director and core faculty at the Spirituality Mind Body Institute (SMBI), Teachers College, Columbia University. He holds a Ph.D. in psychology, MFA in writing, and a Master of Applied Positive Psychology from the University of Pennsylvania, and was formerly the Director of the New York City Certification in Positive Psychology for the New York Open Center. He is also a Review Editor for Frontiers in Psychology's special section on Positive Psychology and recipient of the Teachers College, Columbia University 2021 Teaching Award.

His clinical specialization is in psychodrama and sociometry, with an academic specialization in intellectual disabilities. Tomasulo developed Interactive Behavioral Therapy (IBT) and later Positive-Interactive Behavioral Therapy (P-IBT), forms of group psychotherapy for people with intellectual disabilities, and coauthored the American Psychological Association's first book on the subject: Healing Trauma: The Power of Group Treatment for People with Intellectual Disabilities (2005) with Nancy Razza. Tomasulo is also the author of: Action Methods in Group Psychotherapy: Practical Aspects (1998), Confessions of a Former Child: A Therapist's Memoir (2008), American Snake Pit (2018), Learned Hopefulness, The Power of Positivity To Overcome Depression" (2020), and "The Positivity Effect: Simple CBT Skills to Transform Anxiety and Negativity into Optimism and Hope" (2023).

Education and career

Tomasulo was born in New York City and raised in Waldwick, New Jersey, with an Irish mother and Italian father. He earned a B.S. in psychology from Springfield College in 1973, an M.A. in child development from Fairleigh Dickinson University in 1976, and a Ph.D. in developmental psychology from Yeshiva University in 1981. Tomasulo began his study of psychodrama and group therapy in 1980 with Jacquie Siroka and Bob Siroka. He was hired at Brookdale Community College in 1980 where he won the Master Teacher award and became professor of psychology. He worked there until 2001 and then moved to New Jersey City University where he developed the first online psychology courses and later the first permanent positive psychology course in the New Jersey state system. In 1998–99 he was a teaching fellow at Princeton University under the mentorship of John M. Darley in the psychology department and studied with Tony Award-winning playwright Christopher Durang. He won two international reTHINK Theatre playwriting competitions for his plays on mental health: Negatively Oriented Therapy N.O.T. (2012) and Sticks, Stones and the R Word (2010). Both plays premiered in Auckland, New Zealand.

Mentored by the author Dani Shapiro, Tomasulo studied creative nonfiction and earned an M.F.A. from The New School in 2001. He won the New School MFA Chapbook Competition for his essay "Kettle of Fish," and later studied in the Master of Applied Positive Psychology (M.A.P.P.) at the University of Pennsylvania. In 2012, he became an assistant instructor for Martin Seligman, the Father of Positive Psychology, and James Pawelski, Director of Education and Senior Scholar at the Positive Psychology Center. He was the first psychologist and psychodramatist to graduate from the program and join the teaching staff. In 2011, ShareCare identified him as one of the top ten online influencers on the topic of depression

In 1986, Tomasulo became licensed as a counselling psychologist in New Jersey. In 2005, he and Nancy Razza became the first psychologists to be given the New Jersey Healthcare Providers of the Year award for their work with people with intellectual disabilities. The American Society of Group Psychotherapy and Psychodrama awarded him the David A. Kipper Scholar's Award for research and their Innovators Award for his clinical work in psychodrama with developmentally disabled people. During 1992–2010, he served as contributing editor of their journal and in 2015 was guest editor for the New Jersey Psychologist Special Edition on Positive Psychology. His second memoir, American Snake Pit was published in 2018. In this memoir, Tomasulo chronicles the first experimental group home for the treatment of mentally ill patients coming from the infamous Willowbrook State School, a hell on earth Senator Robert F. Kennedy called a "snake pit." The Willowbrook Consent Decree was designed to protect the constitutional rights of these patients and move them out into the community. Because of the success and the progress made by the in-group homes, mental health became a civil right in the United States and the Civil Rights of Institutionalized Persons Act was enacted. The screenplay for American Snake Pit has won 38 awards at international film festivals since June 2017 including first place in Comedy/Drama at the West New York F.A.M.E. Festival, and was a finalist in the Art of Brooklyn Film Festival and Hollywood Hills Screenplay Competition. His screenplay Rock, Paper, Sister won first place in the short films category at the Poe Film Festival. The short story is about a former heroin addict now an Ivy League music professor who enters a unique form of psychodrama for therapy to deal with a secret he's kept for thirty years. His latest book, Learned Hopefulness, The Power of Positivity To Overcome Depression, was published in 2020, by New Harbinger Publications. It was ranked the number 1 new release on Amazon and Medical News Today named it the best book for positivity in 2021 and in 2022 and 2023 Verywell Mind chose Learned Hopefulness as top 3 best self-help books written by an expert on depression.

Interactive Behavioral Therapy

Interactive Behavioral Therapy (IBT) is a widely used form of evidence-based psychotherapy that was specifically developed for people with dual diagnoses, meaning people who are diagnosed with both an intellectual disability (ID) and a psychological disorder. It uses a modification of theory and technique borrowed from other models in group psychotherapy, and its theoretical foundations and many of its techniques are drawn directly from a form of psychotherapy called psychodrama that was created by Jacob L. Moreno. As people with intellectual disabilities tend to have a difficult time verbalizing their feelings, IBT allows patients to act out particular issues they have while role-playing with others.

In psychodrama, there are three stages during sessions (warm-up, enactment, and sharing), but those with ID have cognitive limitations, making it difficult to talk about abstract thoughts and feelings that are necessary for therapeutic change. In IBT, four stages were developed: orientation, warm-up and sharing, encounter, and affirmation. Each of these stages works toward encouraging patients to communicate effectively while in group settings, particularly those with visual and auditory difficulties, bolsters them with affirmations, and improves social skills.

People with ID have a higher rate of psychological disorders and, as a result, were often subject to diagnostic overshadowing. Their mental illness were often overlooked because of their ID or thought that the symptoms were part of the ID itself. But when mental illness was diagnosed, the route of traditional psychotherapy presented a number of obstacles. IBT addresses the unique circumstances of people with ID and mental illness in addition to giving them a sense of belonging and of self-understanding while learning to help others. By working in IBT, the patients with ID can experience an emotional release and learn there is hope as they each work through their issues.

Books
 Tomasulo, Daniel (2023). The Positivity Effect New Harbinger Publications. 
 Tomasulo, Daniel (2020). Learned Hopefulness: The Power of Positivity to Overcome Depression. New Harbinger Publications. 
Tomasulo, Daniel (2018). American Snake Pit. Stillhouse Press.

References

External links 
 Homepage

1951 births
Living people
Springfield College (Massachusetts) alumni
Scientists from New York City
People from Waldwick, New Jersey
People from Asbury Park, New Jersey
American people of Irish descent
American writers of Italian descent
21st-century American psychologists
Fairleigh Dickinson University alumni
Yeshiva University alumni
Brookdale Community College faculty
New Jersey City University faculty
21st-century American dramatists and playwrights
20th-century American psychologists